Lester Elwood "Epp" Sell (April 26, 1897 – February 19, 1961) was a pitcher in Major League Baseball. He played for the St. Louis Cardinals.

References

External links

1897 births
1961 deaths
Major League Baseball pitchers
St. Louis Cardinals players
Syracuse Stars (minor league baseball) players
Houston Buffaloes players
Baseball players from Pennsylvania